The Supertaça Cândido de Oliveira (English: Cândido de Oliveira Super Cup, or simply Portuguese Super Cup) is an annual Portuguese football match played since 1979 between the winners of the Portuguese League (Primeira Liga) and Portuguese Cup (Taça de Portugal). When a team wins both competitions (thus achieving the double (dobradinha)), it plays again against the Cup runners-up.

The Supertaça has been organised by the Portuguese Football Federation since 1981 and is usually played in August, right before the start of the league season. The trophy is named after former player, coach and sports journalist Cândido de Oliveira.

History 

In the 1943–44 season, the Super Cup was created for a special game between Primeira Divisão champions Sporting CP and Taça de Portugal winners Benfica, on occasion of the inauguration of the Estádio Nacional. The commissioned trophy was named Taça Império – not to be mistaken with Taça do Império, the first incarnation of the Taça de Portugal. After the game, it was decided that the competition was to be continued, but it was later canceled. The second incarnation came 20 years later when Casa da Imprensa (The Press House) instituted a trophy, the Taça de Ouro da Imprensa to be challenged between the national champions and the cup winners.

The Super Cup started unofficially in 1978–79 with a local derby between Boavista (Taça de Portugal holders) and Porto (League champions) that ended with a 2–1 victory for Boavista. The following season, another derby occurred between Benfica and Sporting, which constituted the second unofficial Super Cup and the first played over two legs (home and away). With the success of both unofficial Super Cup editions, the Portuguese Football Federation (FPF) decided to uphold the competition on a yearly basis in a two-legged format. The first official edition took place in the 1981–82 season, already under the current name.

The rules stated that two matches were played and that the aggregate result would determine the winner. If a draw occurred, then a replay of the match should be played in a neutral ground. This occurred six times — 1984, 1991, 1993, 1994, 1995 and 2000 — with the replay of the 1984 edition being contested again in two legs.

Because interest in the Super Cup was waning and in order to reduce the crowded football calendar, in the 2000–01 season, the FPF decided to abolish the two-legged format and replay match and use a single match played in a neutral ground to determine the winner.

Editions

Performance by club 
Note: These statistics do not include the editions of 1944 and 1964.

See also 

 List of association football competitions in Portugal
 List of Supertaça Cândido de Oliveira winning managers

External links 
Supertaça Cândido de Oliveira official page 
Portugal – List of Super Cup Winners, RSSSF.com

 
3
Portugal
1979 establishments in Portugal